Madaripur Shilpakala Academy or Zilla Shilpakala Academy, Madaripur, is the principal state-sponsored district cultural center located at Main Road, Madaripur, Bangladesh. It is the district academy of fine and performing arts. The academy is headed by a Director General.

The academy arranged various programs such as dance, drama festival, music and art, etc. The academy is well known mostly for its various programs staged on national events. It celebrates almost all functions of Bengali culture.

See also
Shilpakala Academy
National Art Gallery (Bangladesh)

References

External links
 

Madaripur Shilpakala Academy at Wikimapia

Cultural organisations based in Bangladesh
Performing arts in Bangladesh